Paul Grayson may refer to:

Paul Grayson (cricketer) (born 1971), English cricketer
Paul Grayson (rugby union) (born 1971), English rugby union player